The 2013 Kuomintang chairmanship election was held on 20 July 2013 in Taiwan with Ma Ying-jeou as the sole candidate. This was the fifth direct election of the chairman in the Kuomintang history. All registered, due-paying KMT party members were eligible to vote.

Result

Aftermath
In his victory speech, Ma promised to enhance cooperation between Kuomintang and the government, cultivate talent and boost the party's momentum for future elections. He was inaugurated as the Chairman of Kuomintang in the party congress be held on 29 September 2013.

General Secretary of the Communist Party of China Xi Jinping congratulated Ma immediately after the election.

See also
 Elections in the Republic of China
 List of leaders of the Kuomintang

References

2013 elections in Taiwan
July 2013 events in Asia
2013
Kuomintang chairmanship election
Single-candidate elections